Taylor Walker (born November 27, 1992) is an American singer, songwriter, and record producer from Inglewood, California. Taylor performed as a writer, keyboardist and vocalist on The Internet's debut album Purple Naked Ladies as well as playing keyboards in the music video for "Objects in the Mirror" from the Mac Miller album Watching Movies With The Sound Off. In 2015 Walker released his debut solo album 25 Hours A Day, independently.

Early life 
Tay Walker was born in Inglewood, California and eldest of three, having two younger brothers. His mother was a musician who used to sing to him, he began singing in the 3rd or 4th grade singing with his mother. Walker's mother introduced him to Motown and The Funk Brothers. Walker self-taught piano player as well as a vocalist, in response, his mother put him in piano classes and the choir as a child.

Career

March 23, 2013 Tay Walker submitted an audition for a Tiny Desk Concert performance. The video was filmed in a middle school music room.

May 28, 2013 - Walker appeared in Mac Miller's, The Space Migration Sessions - "Objects in the Mirror" playing the keyboard as a member of The Internet. Later that year Walker would perform on Jimmy Kimmel Live with Miller.

On August 26, 2017, Walker appeared on Signed, a VH1 Television series where Rick Ross, The Dream and Lenny S, mentor aspiring artists and eventually offered him a place on their respective labels (MMG, Radio Killa Records, and Roc Nation). Tay Walker - one of the winners of the tv show - was offered a deal with MMG.

December 14, 2020 - Tay Walker was photographed in the studio with Kes Kross, Dr. Dre and Walker's manager.

Influences

Tay Walker lists Stevie Wonder and many Motown artists as influences as well as Tyrese Gibson, Michael Jackson, Alicia Keys, Brian McKnight and Jamie Foxx. Walker also listens to a lot of R&B, Jazz, and Neo Soul artists.

Discography

Studio albums

EPs

Singles

Featured Singles

Guest appearances

References 

Living people
21st-century American musicians
Musicians from Inglewood, California
21st-century African-American male singers
African-American record producers
Record producers from California
American male pop singers
American hip hop singers
American multi-instrumentalists
1992 births
21st-century American singers
21st-century American male singers